Owen Johnson may refer to:

 Owen Johnson (writer) (1878–1952), American writer
 Owen H. Johnson (1929–2014), New York State Senator
 Owen Johnson (dendrologist), British dendrologist
 Owen Johnson (footballer) (1919–2001), English footballer